Textual variants in the Epistle of James are the subject of the study called textual criticism of the New Testament. Textual variants in manuscripts arise when a copyist makes deliberate or inadvertent alterations to a text that is being reproduced. An abbreviated list of textual variants in this particular book is given in this article below.

Most of the variations are not significant and some common alterations include the deletion, rearrangement, repetition, or replacement of one or more words when the copyist's eye returns to a similar word in the wrong location of the original text. If their eye skips to an earlier word, they may create a repetition (error of dittography). If their eye skips to a later word, they may create an omission. They may resort to performing a rearranging of words to retain the overall meaning without compromising the context. In other instances, the copyist may add text from memory from a similar or parallel text in another location. Otherwise, they may also replace some text of the original with an alternative reading. Spellings occasionally change. Synonyms may be substituted. A pronoun may be changed into a proper noun (such as "he said" becoming "Jesus said"). John Mill's 1707 Greek New Testament was estimated to contain some 30,000 variants in its accompanying textual apparatus which was based on "nearly 100 [Greek] manuscripts." Peter J. Gurry puts the number of non-spelling variants among New Testament manuscripts around 500,000, though he acknowledges his estimate is higher than all previous ones.

Legend

Other notable manuscripts in the Epistle of James

Textual variants

See also 
 Alexandrian text-type
 Biblical inerrancy
 Byzantine text-type
 Caesarean text-type
 Categories of New Testament manuscripts
 Comparison of codices Sinaiticus and Vaticanus
 List of New Testament verses not included in modern English translations
 Textual variants in the New Testament
 Western text-type

References

Further reading 

 Novum Testamentum Graece et Latine, ed. E. Nestle, K. Aland, Stuttgart 1981.
 Bruce M. Metzger & Bart D. Ehrman, "The Text of the New Testament: Its Transmission, Corruption, and Restoration", OUP New York, Oxford, 4 edition, 2005
 Bart D. Ehrman, "The Orthodox Corruption of Scripture. The Effect of Early Christological Controversies on the Text of the New Testament", Oxford University Press, New York - Oxford, 1996, pp. 223–227.
 Bruce M. Metzger, "A Textual Commentary on the Greek New Testament: A Companion Volume to the United Bible Societies' Greek New Testament", 1994, United Bible Societies, London & New York.

External links 
 The Comparative Critical Greek New Testament 
 Variantes textuais 
 Varianten Textus receptus versus Nestle-Aland

Greek New Testament manuscripts
Biblical criticism
Textual criticism
Epistle of James